A urachal cyst is a sinus remaining from the allantois during embryogenesis. It is a cyst which occurs in the remnants between the umbilicus and bladder. This is a type of cyst occurring in a persistent portion of the urachus, presenting as an extraperitoneal mass in the umbilical region. It is characterized by abdominal pain, and fever if infected. It may rupture, leading to peritonitis, or it may drain through the umbilicus. Urachal cysts are usually silent clinically until infection, calculi or adenocarcinoma develop.

Symptoms and signs
 Lower abdominal pain
 Pain on urination
 Persistent umbilical discharge
 Fever
 Urinary tract infection
 Lump
 Hematuria

Diagnosis
Urachal cysts are rare defects found mostly in young children and hence medical ultrasound of the abdomen, bladder and pelvis is the most used diagnostic tool combined with MRI scan and CT scan in older patients who can remain still during a scan.

See also
 urachus
 cyst

References

External links 

Gross pathology
Congenital disorders of urinary system